Marylebone was a parliamentary constituency in Middlesex, England from 1832 to 1885. The parliamentary borough formed part of the built up area of London, and returned two members to the House of Commons of the UK Parliament and was created under the Reform Act 1832. It was abolished by the Redistribution of Seats Act, 1885 which split it into 8 seats.

Boundaries

Marylebone was one of five parliamentary boroughs in the metropolitan area of London enfranchised in 1832. The listed civil parishes (succeeding the parish vestries in all civil, secular matters) are respectively tinted pink, green and yellow on the inset map. The constituency was defined as consisting of three civil parishes in Middlesex:
Saint Marylebone 
Paddington
Saint Pancras
The commissioners appointed to fix its boundaries recommended that the part of Saint Pancras north of the Regent's Canal should be omitted thus remain in the parliamentary county of Middlesex being a still a largely rural projection. The inhabitants of  Pancras, however, petitioned parliament for the inclusion of the entire parish, and this was accepted.

In 1885 the entity was split into eight new single-member divisions:
Marylebone East
Marylebone West
Paddington North
Paddington South
St. Pancras East
St. Pancras North
St. Pancras South
St. Pancras West.

Members of Parliament

Notes
 1 Election of Whalley in 1837 declared void on petition, as he could not prove his eligibility.
 2 A peer of Ireland.

Elections
Turnout, in multi-member elections, is estimated by dividing the number of votes by two. To the extent that electors did not use both their votes, the figure given will be an underestimate.

Change is calculated for individual candidates, when a party had more than one candidate in an election or the previous one. When a party had 
only one candidate in an election and the previous one change is calculated for the party vote.

Elections in the 1830s

Portsman resigned by accepting the office of Steward of the Chiltern Hundreds, causing a by-election.

† Murray was the government-approved candidate, but withdrew from the contest prior to the completion of polling.

Whalley's election was declared void on petition, due to him having insufficient estate to qualify, causing a by-election.

Elections in the 1840s

Elections in the 1850s

 
 

Hall was appointed President of the General Board of Health, requiring a by-election.

 

Stuart's death caused a by-election.

 
 

Hall was appointed First Commissioner of Works and Public Buildings, requiring a by-election.

 

Fortescue resigned, causing a by-election.

 
 

 
 
 

Hall succeeded to the peerage, becoming Lord Llanover and causing a by-election.

Elections in the 1860s
James' resignation caused a by-election.

Elections in the 1870s

Elections in the 1880s

 

 Constituency abolished (1885)

References 

 Boundaries of Parliamentary Constituencies 1885-1972, compiled and edited by F.W.S. Craig (Parliamentary Reference Publications 1972)
 British Parliamentary Election Results 1832-1885, compiled and edited by F.W.S. Craig (Macmillan Press 1977)
 Who's Who of British Members of Parliament: Volume I 1832-1885, edited by M. Stenton (The Harvester Press 1976)
 Who's Who of British Members of Parliament, Volume II 1886-1918, edited by M. Stenton and S. Lees (Harvester Press 1978)
 The Times, 8th Dec. 1884; p. 13.

External links
MAPCO: Map And Plan Collection Online - Topographical Survey Of The Borough Of St. Marylebone 1834

Politics of the City of Westminster
Parliamentary constituencies in London (historic)
Constituencies of the Parliament of the United Kingdom established in 1832
Constituencies of the Parliament of the United Kingdom disestablished in 1885